Dardania was a Roman province in the Central Balkans, initially an unofficial region in Moesia (87–284), and then a province administratively part of the Diocese of Moesia (293–337). It was named after the tribe of the Dardani who inhabited the region in classical antiquity prior to the Roman conquest.

Background 

Dardania is named after the Dardani, a tribe that lived in the region and formed the Kingdom of Dardania in the 4th century BC. The eastern parts of the region were at the Thraco-Illyrian contact zone. In archaeological research, Illyrian names are predominant in western Dardania (present-day Kosovo), while Thracian names are mostly found in eastern Dardania (present-day south-eastern Serbia). Thracian names are absent in western Dardania; some Illyrian names appear in the eastern parts. The correspondence of Illyrian names - including those of the ruling elite - in Dardania with those of the southern Illyrians suggests a "thracianization" of parts of Dardania. Celts were present in Dardania in 279 BC.

In 179 BC, the Bastarnae conquered the Dardani, who later in 174 pushed them out, in a war which proved catastrophic, with a few years later, in 170 BC, the Macedonians defeating the Dardani. Macedonia and Illyria became Roman protectorates in 168 BC. The Scordisci, a tribe of Celtic origin, most likely subdued the Dardani in the mid-2nd century BC, after which there is for a long time no mention of the Dardani. In 97 BC the Dardani are mentioned again, defeated by the Macedonian Roman army. Dardanian slaves or freedmen at the time of the Roman conquest were clearly of Paleo-Balkan origin, according to their personal names, noted as being mostly of the "Central-Dalmatian type". Dardania was Romanized early on.

Administration 

After the Roman conquest, the pre-Roman Dardania eventually was organized into the Moesia province. During the reign of Domitian (81–96), in 86, Moesia was subdivided into Upper and Lower Moesia (Moesia Superior and Moesia Inferior). The old name of Dardania was used for a new province part of Moesia Superior. Ptolemy (100–170) calls Dardania a special district of Moesia Superior.

The Diocese of Moesia was a diocese established by Emperor Diocletian (r. 284–305). During his reign, the diocese included 11 provinces, one of which was Dardania. Dardania and Moesia Prima were established by dividing them from Moesia Superior, probably under Diocletian. During or likely after emperor Constantine I (r. 306–337), Dacia Mediterranea was created out of parts of Dardania and Thrace. The two new dioceses, Moesia and Dacia, were grouped into the new praetorian prefecture of Illyricum in the second half of the 4th century, which essentially covered the same area as the earlier Diocese of Moesia.

Religion 
Little is known regarding Christianity in the Balkans in the three first centuries AD. Bishop Dacus of Macedonia, from Dardania, was present at the First Council of Nicaea (325).

In 535, emperor Justinian I (527-565) created the Archbishopric of Justiniana Prima as a regional primacy with ecclesiastical jurisdiction over all provinces of the Diocese of Dacia, including the province of Dardania.

Economy 
According to the Expositio totius mundi (ca. 350), Dardania supplied Macedonia with cheese and lard.

Cities and towns 
The main centres of Roman Dardania were Scupi (Skopje), Naissus (Niš) and Ulpiana (Lipjan). At the time of Moesia Superior, the towns in Dardania included Scupi, Naissus, Ulpiana, Therranda, Vicianum, Vindenis, Velanis, Dardapara, Quemedava and Damastion.

The Romans occupied Naissos in the period of the "Dardanian War" (75–73 BC), and set up a legionary camp. The city (called refugia and vici in pre-Roman relation), because of its strategic position (Thracians were based to the south) developed as an important garrison and market town of Moesia Superior. The Romans also founded a mining town named municipium Dardanicum.

Aftermath 
 
The area remained part of the Eastern Roman, Byzantine Empire, after the Eastern–Western Roman split in the 5th century. Procopius (500–560) used the old Roman provinces to describe the geography of the Balkans. According to Buildings of Justinian IV, there were 8 new and 61 restored fortifications in Dardania. Dardania was a region in which Justinian's restoration process was predominant. In 518 an earthquake devastated Dardania, followed by famine that killed much of the population and weakened the Empire's defences. According to Florin Curta, a small number of Slavs (Sclaveni and Antes) migrated to the Balkans in the 6th century.

See also 
 Illyrians
 Dardani
 Kingdom of Dardania
 Serbia in the Roman era
 Archaeology of Kosovo
 Illyricum (Roman province)
 Roman heritage in Kosovo

References

Sources

External links 

 
Late Roman provinces
Serbia in the Roman era
Macedonia (Roman province)
Bulgaria in the Roman era
States and territories established in the 3rd century
States and territories disestablished in the 6th century